The Klingbach is a stream, just under  long, in South Palatinate, Germany, and a left-hand tributary of the Michelsbach.

Geography

Course 

Another, almost equally strong, source is situated a good two kilometres to the south. The two source streams converged after about three kilometres in Silz.

The Klingbach leaves the hills in an eastern direction at Klingenmünster  and crosses the German Wine Route before reaching the Upper Rhine Plain. It flows through the western half of the plain, initially in an easterly direction, but later swinging more to the northeast. Southeast of Rohrbach it is joined on the left by the Kaiserbach, almost 20 kilometres long, and above Herxheim by the eight kilometre long Quodbach.

Until the first half of the 19th century, the Klingbach emptied into a bend of the Upper Rhine east of Hördt. With the channelization of the Rhine its confluence became part of the  Old Rhine. Today the old bend in the river is a river in its own right, called the Michelsbach.

Municipalities along the Klingbach 
 Silz
 Münchweiler
 Klingenmünster
 Heuchelheim-Klingen
 Billigheim-Ingenheim
 Steinweiler
 Rohrbach
 Herxheim
 Herxheimweyher
 Rülzheim
 Hördt

History 
Running upstream alongside the Klingbach is part of the southern section of the Palatine Ways of St. James.

To distinguish it from other places with the name Münster ("minster"), the municipality of Klingenmünster was named after the stream.

References

See also 
List of rivers of Rhineland-Palatinate

Rivers of Rhineland-Palatinate
South Palatinate
Rivers and lakes of the Palatinate Forest
Rivers of Germany